Daniel Willard Fiske (November 11, 1831 – September 17, 1904) was an American librarian and scholar, born on November 11, 1831, at Ellisburg, New York.

Biography
Fiske studied at Cazenovia Seminary and started his collegiate studies at  Hamilton College in 1847. He joined the Psi Upsilon but was suspended for a student prank at the end of his sophomore year.  He was educated at Copenhagen and at Uppsala University.  Upon his return to the United States, he acted as a General Secretary to the American Geographical Society and edited the Syracuse Daily Journal.

Upon the opening of Cornell University in Ithaca, New York, Fiske was named university librarian and professor in 1868.  He made a reputation as an authority on the Northern European languages, and Icelandic language and culture in particular.

With loans from Andrew Dickson White, Fiske at age 48 took a leave of absence and sailed to Europe. In the summer of 1879, he visited Iceland for three months, traveling on the island with two other Americans and endearing himself to the residents by organizing donations of books from America. He traveled to Rome in April 1880 to join Jennie McGraw, then age 40. In July 1880, he married Jennie, at the American Legation in Berlin. McGraw was the daughter of timber magnate John McGraw, and upon John McGraw's death in 1877 inherited $2.2 million ($ today).  Their marriage was short, and by September 1881 she had died from tuberculosis. Controversy over her will's bequest to Cornell left Fiske involved in the Great Will Case. Following its resolution in May 1890, he spent much of his remaining years in Italy, and collected manuscripts.

His interests included chess; he helped organize the first American Chess Congress in 1857 and wrote the tournament book in 1859, and edited The Chess Monthly from 1857 to 1861 with Paul Morphy.  His scholarly volume, Chess In Iceland and in Icelandic Literature (Florence, 1905), was used as source material by H. J. R. Murray for A History of Chess.  Another manuscript, Chess Tales and Chess Miscellanies (New York, 1912), also published posthumously, is an anthology covering chess life of the period including articles about Morphy, problems by Sam Loyd, and the history of chess including some fables.

Fiske donated thousands of volumes to Cornell including a 1536 edition of the Divine Comedy that he purchased in April 1892 and directed to be sent directly to Cornell. The Fiske Dante Collection grew out of this acquisition and as of 2005 numbered approximately 10,000 volumes.

On September 17, 1904 Fiske died at Frankfurt am Main, Germany. He is buried next to his wife Jennie McGraw Fiske in the elaborate crypt of Sage Chapel at Cornell University.  Upon his death, Fiske left a bequest of 32,000 volumes, the Fiske Icelandic Collection, to Cornell along with funds that Fiske had received from Jennie's estate.

References

External links
 
 
 
 Willard Fiske: Journeys of a Bibliophile (PDF)
 Fiske Icelandic Collection at Cornell University Library
 
 Edward Winter's "A Debate on Staunton, Morphy and Edge" (Chess Notes Feature Article)

1831 births
1904 deaths
American chess players
American chess writers
American male non-fiction writers
American non-fiction writers
Cazenovia College alumni
Hamilton College (New York) alumni
Uppsala University alumni
Cornell University faculty
Linguists from the United States
Chess patrons
Chess historians
People from Ellisburg, New York
Burials at Sage Chapel
19th-century American philanthropists
19th-century chess players
Members of the American Academy of Arts and Letters